Sky Arena is a pay-per-view channel operated in New Zealand by Sky Network Television. Until 2015 Sky Arena was also spin-off event promoter company jointly owned by Sky and VADR Media. Sky Arena screens events on  such as professional wrestling, mixed martial arts, boxing and concerts. The David Tua vs Monte Barrett during August 2011 was the first Sky Arena event screened in 1080i high-definition. The biggest event in PPV New Zealand history was David Tua vs Shane Cameron. The event has the record with the most buys with 88,000 buys in New Zealand. The channel previously screened WWE pay-per-view events until January 2022, when Sky's pay-per-view rights agreement ended with WWE.

Current pay-per-views
DAZN Boxing (rights shared with DAZN)
UFC (rights shared with Spark Sport)

References

External links

Television channels and stations established in 2011
Television stations in New Zealand
English-language television stations in New Zealand